David Baird Cheadle, Jr. (February 19, 1952 – February 25, 2012) was an American professional baseball player. A ,  left-handed pitcher, he appeared in two Major League games pitched for the  Atlanta Braves.  He was born in Greensboro, North Carolina, and attended Asheville High School in Asheville, North Carolina. He attended and graduated from the University of North Carolina at Chapel Hill, after his baseball career ended.

Career
Cheadle was drafted in the first round of the 1970 Major League Baseball draft by the New York Yankees and spent almost four seasons in the Bombers' farm system before his inclusion in an August 1973 trade to that sent veteran right-handed pitcher Pat Dobson to New York from the Braves. Cheadle made his Major League debut on September 16, 1973, at Riverfront Stadium in relief against the eventual National League West Division champion Cincinnati Reds.  In the extra-inning contest, he pitched a scoreless 11th inning, retiring Reds stars Pete Rose and Joe Morgan, but issued a base on balls to Denis Menke leading off the 12th, then balked him to second base. Menke would later score on a hit given up by Cheadle's successor on the mound, Adrian Devine, tagging Cheadle with the loss. In his next outing, nine days later, Cheadle pitched one inning in relief of Phil Niekro and surrendered a three-run home run to Ron Cey, insurance runs for Los Angeles Dodgers' starting pitcher Don Sutton in a 5–1 Dodger win. Cheadle never saw any Major League action after 1973.

In two MLB innings pitched, Cheadle allowed four hits, four earned runs, and three bases on balls, two of them intentional. He recorded only one strikeout — but it was against all-time hits leader Rose in Cheadle's MLB debut.

Cheadle died on February 25, 2012, in St. Augustine, Florida, 6 days after his 60th birthday.

References

External links
 Dave Cheadle's stats and bio from Baseball Cube

1952 births
2012 deaths
Baseball players from North Carolina
Atlanta Braves players
Charleston Charlies players
Fort Lauderdale Yankees players
Johnson City Yankees players
Sportspeople from Asheville, North Carolina
Richmond Braves players
Syracuse Chiefs players
University of North Carolina at Chapel Hill alumni
Victoria Mussels players
West Haven Yankees players